Leśniki  is a part of Szymanowice Duże village, Gmina Sobienie-Jeziory.The population is near 60. From 1975 to 1998 this place was in Siedlce Voivodeship. It lies near the Vistula river.

Villages in Otwock County